The Rother-class lifeboat was a self-righting lifeboat operated by the Royal National Lifeboat Institution around the coast of the United Kingdom and Ireland between 1972 and 1995. They were based on the  Oakley-class lifeboat.

History
The Rother-class was the final displacement hull lifeboat produced by the RNLI. As a result of the decision to have fast lifeboats at all all-weather stations they had a shorter than usual career and none of the 14 built reached 20 years service.

Design
The Rother-class was a development of the   boat, like its predecessor primarily intended for carriage launching, although 6 of the 14 went to slipway stations. A major change was the abandonment of the Oakley's complicated water ballast self-righting system. The Rother achieved its self-righting ability from its extended watertight superstructure and all had an enclosed wheelhouse with the radar mounted on the roof.

Fleet
Note: Op No's 37-01 to 37-26 were allocated to Oakley-class lifeboats

References

External links

 RNLI